Kore , also known as , is the outermost natural satellite of Jupiter. It was discovered by a team of astronomers from the University of Hawaii led by Scott S. Sheppard in 2003 and given the provisional designation .

Kore is about 2 kilometers in diameter, and orbits Jupiter at an average distance of 23,239,000 km in 723.720 days, at an inclination of 141° to the ecliptic (139° to Jupiter's equator), in a retrograde direction and with an eccentricity of 0.2462.

It belongs to the Pasiphae group, which is made up of irregular retrograde moons orbiting Jupiter at distances ranging between 22.8 and 24.1 Gm, and with inclinations ranging between 144.5° and 158.3°.

It was named after Kore, another name for the Greek goddess Persephone (from the Greek κόρη, "daughter [of Demeter]").

References

Pasiphae group
Moons of Jupiter
Irregular satellites
Discoveries by Scott S. Sheppard
Astronomical objects discovered in 2003
Moons with a retrograde orbit